David Spicer is a writer, perhaps best known for his BBC Radio 4 comedy series.  He has also written for gameshows and panel shows and television comedies.
He may also be the author of the play Superheroes, based on the protest group Fathers for Justice.

Works

BBC Radio 4 comedy series

 Double Income, No Kids Yet (18 episodes, 2001-2003)
 Three Off the Tee (12 episodes, 2005-2006)
 Me and Joe (2008, an afternoon play)
 28 Minutes to Save the NHS (4 episodes, 2002)

Game and panel shows
He has written for a number of games shows and panel shows, including:

 Win My Wage (2007)
 That'll Test 'Em (2006)
 Nobody Likes a Smartass (2003)
 No Win No Fee (2001)
 RTFP (short-lived Radio 4 panel game, 1998, co-written with Steve Gribbin)
 Quizland (BBC 7, a 21-part quiz series for children from 4 to 6 years old)
 Hot Gas (script editor)

TV comedy series
He has written for a number of comedy TV series including:

 Comedy Lab (1999)
 Give Your Mate a Break (1999)
 Armstrong and Miller (1997)
 Saturday Live (1996)
 Barrymore (1991)

References

External links
 

Year of birth missing (living people)
Living people
British radio writers
British television writers